Spilarctia dinawa is a moth in the family Erebidae. It was described by George Thomas Bethune-Baker in 1904. It is found in Papua and Papua New Guinea. The habitat consists of low and moderate altitudes.

Adults are variable. The forewings can vary in colour from pale yellowish brown to almost chocolate brown.

References

Moths described in 1904
dinawa